The Gigolo 2 is a 2016 Hong Kong erotic comedy film directed by Venus Keung and starring Dominic Ho, Connie Man, Jazz Lam and Iris Chung. It is the sequel to The Gigolo (2015). The film was released on 14 January 2016 in Hong Kong.

Plot
Before Fung Ho claimed to be top of his career, he is now a semi-retired gigolo and runs a nightclub named High X. Monica and Sushi are two best friends who are extras in film and television for survivals. At Sushi's birthday party, Monica gets to know Fung when she can't find a taxi to get home and Fung offers to drive her back. After filming, Yi Tung, a madam comes to the set and asks Sushi if she wants to go for a boat party where there are rich guys. Sushi asks Monica along too despite her reluctance. Halfway throughout the boat party, Monica receives a text from her elder brother that her mother has been sent to the hospital. She panics as she is unable to go onshore. She meets Fung who is at the party too and he decides to take her back onshore on his speedboat. After fetching her mother home, Monica holds a family meeting with her siblings to decide who takes care of her mother but her siblings refuse to take the responsibility and she falls out with them. Her mother also has to undergo surgery. In order to get enough money for the high-cost surgery, Monica decides to join Sushi  to be a prostitute. However, she is shy and nervous about sex, especially about anal sex and blowjobs. Sushi recommends her to Fung to learn the sex craft and after some coaching by Fung, she manages to overcome her problem and becomes an expert at pleasuring men. She also fell in love with Fung while being coached by Fung.

After she graduated from Fung, she sees Fung together with another girl Isabel, a lawyer who is going to be married and feels unhappy as a result. Sushi and her boyfriend Dick want to buy an apartment and are short of cash. Yi Tung recommends them to Big Dog but Dick feels apprehensive as he heard of gigolos being injured terribly while being hired by Big Dog and his wife Mona for sexual services. However, Sushi insists on accepting the offer. During the process, Sushi and Dick are killed by Big dog and Mona due to rough treatment.  Monica and Fung saw the news of Sushi being murdered and decide to take revenge on Big Dog and Mona.

After that, Monica and Fung get married, but during the wedding, Fung is murdered by a few thugs hired by Isabel's husband as he found out that Isabel is having Fung's baby when he himself is sterilized.

Cast
 Dominic Ho as Fung Ho, a retired gigolo who runs his own nightclub
 Connie Man as Monica, a film and TV extra
 Jazz Lam as Dick, a male gigolo
 Iris Chung as Sushi, friend of Monica
 Leslie Lam as Isabel, a lawyer
 Teresa Mak as Yi Tung, a madam
 Winnie Leung as Mona, wife of Big Dog
 Hazel Tong as Yoyo, an actress with a bad temper
 Tony Ho as Big Dog, husband of Mona
 Samuel Leung as Master Long
 Gill Mohindepaul Singh as Uncle Chiu
 Ronan Pak as Steven
 Wang Wanyou as Sara

References

External links
 

2016 films
Hong Kong comedy-drama films
2016 comedy-drama films
Hong Kong erotic films
2010s erotic drama films
Hong Kong sequel films
2010s Hong Kong films
Films about gigolos
2010s Cantonese-language films